Houghton is an unincorporated community in Brown County, South Dakota, United States. Its population is not tracked by the Census Bureau. Houghton is the site of a post office serving ZIP code 57449.

History
Houghton was platted in 1886. It was named for C. W. Houghton, an original owner of the town site. A post office was established in Houghton in 1886.

Notable people
Ralph Herseth, twenty-first Governor of South Dakota from 1959 to 1961.
Stephanie Herseth Sandlin, Former U.S. Representative and president of Augustana University.

References

Unincorporated communities in Brown County, South Dakota
Unincorporated communities in South Dakota
Aberdeen, South Dakota micropolitan area